Aillon may refer to two communes in the Savoie department, in southeastern France:
 Aillon-le-Jeune
 Aillon-le-Vieux

See also
Aillón